Djupvika may refer to:

Djupvika Bay, Antarctica
Djupvika Beach, Norway